The Journal of Neuroinflammation is a peer-reviewed open-access scientific journal covering immunological responses of the nervous system. It was established in 2004 and is published by BioMed Central. The editors-in-chief are Sue T. Griffin (University of Arkansas for Medical Sciences) and Monica J. Carson (University of California, Riverside), who succeeded Robert E. Mrak (University of Toledo Medical Center) in 2018.

Abstracting and indexing 
The journal is abstracted and indexed in:

According to the Journal Citation Reports, the journal has a 2020 impact factor of 8.322, ranking it 59th out of 252 journals in the category "Neurosciences".

References

External links 
 

Neuroscience journals
BioMed Central academic journals
Publications established in 2004
Creative Commons Attribution-licensed journals
Immunology journals
English-language journals